This is a list of yearly Central Intercollegiate Athletic Association football standings.

CIAA standings

Early years

NCAA Division II (2004–present)

References

Standings
Central Intercollegiate Athletic Association
College football-related lists